Foča is a town and a municipality located in Republika Srpska in south-eastern Bosnia and Herzegovina, on the banks of Drina river. As of 2013, the town has a population of 12,234 inhabitants, while the municipality has 18,288 inhabitants.

Foča houses some faculties (including the Medical and Orthodox Theological Faculty of Saint Basil of Ostrog) from the Istočno Sarajevo University.
It is also home to the "Seminary of Saint Peter of Sarajevo and Dabar-Bosna", one of seven seminaries in the Serbian Orthodox Church. Foča was also, until 1992, home to one of Bosnia's most important Islamic high schools, the Madrasa of Mehmed Pasha Kukavica.
The Sutjeska National Park, which is the oldest National Park in Bosnia and Herzegovina, is located in the municipality.

History

Early history

The town was known as Hotča during medieval times. It was then known as a trading centre on route between Ragusa (now Dubrovnik) and Constantinople (now Istanbul, Turkey). Alongside the rest of Gornje Podrinje, Foča was part of the Serbian Empire until 1376, when it was attached to the Kingdom of Bosnia under King Tvrtko. After Tvrtko's death, the town was ruled by the dukes of Hum, most notably was Herzog Stjepan. Foča was the seat of the Ottoman Sanjak of Herzegovina established in 1470, and served as such until 1572, when the seat was moved to Pljevlja.

World War II

In 1941, the Ustaše killed the leading Serbs in Foča. Between December 1941 and January 1942 over two thousand Bosnian Muslims were killed in Foča by the Chetniks as act of vengeance for repression over Serbs by Muslims in ranks of Ustaše. Additionally Chetniks attacked Ustaše and in Foča in August 1942.

On 13 February 1943, Pavle Đurišić reported to Draža Mihailović the actions undertaken by the Chetniks in the Foča, Pljevlja, and Čajniče districts: "All Muslim villages in the three mentioned districts were totally burned so that not a single home remained in one piece. All property was destroyed except cattle, corn, and senna."

In the operation Chetnik losses "were 22 dead, of which 2 through accidents, and 32 wounded. Among the Muslims, around 1,200 fighters and up to couple of thousands of civilian victims of both nationalitys." Đurišić said what remained of the Muslim population fled and that actions were taken to prevent their return. The municipality is also the site of the legendary Battle of Sutjeska between the Tito's Yugoslav Partisans and the German army. A monument to the Partisans killed in the battle was erected in the village of Tjentište.

Bosnian War 

In 1992, at the onset of the Bosnian War, the city fell under the control of the Army of Republika Srpska.
From 7 April 1992 to January 1994, Serb military, police and paramilitary forces enacted a campaign of ethnic cleansing in the area of Foča against Bosniak civilians. By one estimate, around 21,000 non-Serbs left Foča after July 1992. Most of them that managed to escape were settled in the town of Rožaje in Montenegro until the war ended. Only about 10 Muslims remained at the end of the conflict. Thirteen mosques including the Aladža Mosque were destroyed and the 22,500 Muslims who made up the majority of inhabitants fled. The Tribunal Judges determined beyond a reasonable doubt that the purpose of the Serb campaign in Foča was, among others, "to cleanse the Foča area of Muslims" and concluded that "to that end the campaign was successful.

In numerous verdicts, the International Criminal Tribunal for the former Yugoslavia (ICTY) ruled that the ethnic cleansing, killings, mass rapes, and the deliberate destruction of Bosniak property and cultural sites constituted crimes against humanity. According to the Research and Documentation Center (IDC), 2,707 people were killed or went missing in the Foča municipality during the war. Among them were 1,513 Bosniak civilians and 155 Serb civilians. Additionally, Bosnian Serb authorities set up rape camps in which hundreds of women were raped. Numerous Serb officers, soldiers and other participants in the Foča massacres were accused and convicted of war crimes by the ICTY.

Post-war period 
In 1995 the Dayton Agreement created a territorial corridor linking the once-besieged city of Goražde to the Federation entity; as a consequence, the northern part of Foča was separated to create the municipality of Foča-Ustikolina. Prior to that in 1994, the ethnically-cleansed town was renamed Srbinje, "place of the Serbs". In 2004, the Constitutional Court of Bosnia and Herzegovina declared the name change unconstitutional, and reverted it back to Foča.

Since the war, around 4,000 Bosniaks have returned to their homes in Foča, and several mosques have been re-built. This has taken place largely due to the administration of Zdravko Krsmanović, who was mayor from 2004 to 2012. In the 2012 elections, however, Krsmanović was defeated and a new mayor, Radisav Mašić, was elected with support of parties SDS and SNSD.

The Aladža Mosque was rebuilt from 2014 and reopened in May 2019.

In October 2004, members of the Association of Women Victims of War (Udruzenje Žene-Žrtve Rata) attempted to lay a plaque in front of the Partizan sports hall (also used in 1992 as a rape camp) to commemorate the crimes that occurred there. Around 300 Bosnian Serbs, including members of the Association of the Prisoners of War of Republika Srpska, prevented the plaque from being affixed.

The Partizan sport hall was reconstructed by UNDP, with EU funding, following a selection by the Foča municipal council,  also with the participation of elected representatives of local returnees.

In 2018 and 2019, the association of war victims have been commemorating rape as a weapon of war by congregating in front of Karaman's House in Miljevina and of the Partizan sport hall in Foča on the International Day for the Elimination of Sexual Violence in Conflict (19 June).

In 2021, a memorial to convicted Srebrenica massacre perpetrator Ratko Mladić was painted near a school in the town.

Settlements

Aside from the town of Foča, the municipality includes the following settlements:

 Anđelije
 Bastasi
 Bavčići
 Beleni
 Bešlići
 Biokovo
 Birotići
 Bogavići
 Borje
 Borovinići
 Brajići
 Brajkovići, Foča
 Brod
 Brusna
 Budanj
 Bujakovina
 Bunčići
 Bunovi
 Cerova Ravan
 Crnetići
 Cvilin
 Čelebići
 Čelikovo Polje
 Ćurevo
 Daničići
 Derolovi
 Donje Žešće
 Drače
 Dragočava
 Dragojevići
 Đeđevo
 Fališi
 Filipovići
 Glušca
 Godijeno
 Gostičaj
 Govza
 Gradac
 Grandići
 Grdijevići
 Hum
 Huseinovići
 Igoče
 Izbišno
 Jasenovo
 Ječmišta
 Jeleč
 Jošanica
 Kolakovići
 Kolun
 Kosman
 Kozarevina
 Kozja Luka
 Kratine
 Krna Jela
 Kruševo
 Kunduci
 Kunovo
 Kuta
 Lokve
 Ljubina
 Marevo
 Mazlina
 Mazoče
 Meštrevac
 Miljevina
 Mirjanovići
 Mješaji
 Mravljača
 Njuhe
 Orahovo
 Papratno
 Patkovina
 Paunci
 Petojevići
 Podgrađe
 Poljice
 Popov Most
 Potpeće
 Previla
 Prevrać
 Prijeđel
 Prisoje
 Puriši
 Račići
 Radojevići
 Rijeka
 Rodijelj
 Slatina
 Slavičići
 Stojkovići
 Sorlaci
 Susješno
 Škobalji
 Štović
 Šuljci
 Tečići
 Tjentište
 Tođevac
 Toholji
 Trbušće
 Trtoševo
 Tvrdaci
 Ustikolina
 Velenići
 Vikoč
 Vitine
 Vojnovići
 Vranjevići
 Vrbnica
 Vučevo
 Vukušići
 Zabor
 Zakmur
 Zavait
 Zebina Šuma
 Zubovići
 Željevo

Demographics

Population

Ethnic composition

Economy

The following table gives a preview of total number of registered people employed in legal entities per their core activity (as of 2018):

Culture

Museum of old Herzegovina and city theatre are located in Foča.

Twin towns – sister cities
Foča is twinned with:
   Kragujevac 
   Nikšić

Notable people
 Zehra Deović, folk singer 
 Rade Krunić, footballer
 Aida Hadžialić, politician in Sweden
 Maksim Vasiljević

References

External links

 

 
Populated places in Foča
Cities and towns in Republika Srpska
Municipalities of Republika Srpska